Harry Garner Haskell Jr. (May 27, 1921 –  January 16, 2020) was an American businessman and Republican politician from Wilmington, Delaware. He served as mayor of Wilmington from 1969 to 1973 and represented Delaware in the U.S. House of Representatives from 1957 to 1959.

Early life
Haskell was born in Wilmington, the son of Elizabeth (Denham) and Harry Garner Haskelll, a DuPont executive. He was educated at Tower Hill School in Wilmington, and St. Mark's School, Southborough, Massachusetts. He attended Princeton University from 1940 until 1942 when he enlisted in the United States Coast Guard Reserve. He was made an ensign in 1943 and was discharged as a lieutenant (junior grade) in 1946.

Career 
Haskell was the personnel manager of Speakman Co. in 1947 and 1948, and president of Greenhill Dairies, Inc., from 1948 until 1953, and then owner and operator of Hill Girt Farm in Chadds Ford, Pennsylvania. He was secretary of the Departmental Council of the United States Department of Health, Education, and Welfare in 1953 and 1954, consultant to the special assistant to U.S. President Dwight D. Eisenhower in 1955, and president of the University of Delaware Research Foundation.

Haskell was a delegate to the Republican National Conventions from 1952 until 1984 and was elected to the U.S. House of Representatives in 1956, defeating incumbent Democratic U.S. Representative Harris McDowell. Haskell voted in favor of the Civil Rights Act of 1957. He served in the Republican minority in the 85th Congress but lost his bid for a second term in 1958 to McDowell. Haskell served from January 3, 1957, until January 3, 1959, during the administration of U.S. President Dwight D. Eisenhower. He was elected mayor of Wilmington, Delaware, in 1969, serving one term until 1973.

In 1970, he was appointed a member of the President's National Reading Council and was president of Abercrombie and Fitch. He also worked with Computer International, Computer Time Sharing, Inertial Motors Corps, and Interpoint Corp.

Advocacy 
He was a founding member of the Brandywine River Museum and Conservancy in Chadds Ford and served on the board for over fifty years. He was also instrumental in creating two empowerment and mentor groups, in Worcester, Massachusetts and Wilmington Delaware; Dynamy and Delaware Futures, respectively.

Personal life 
On January 16, 2020, Haskell died in his home in Chadds Ford. He was 98 years old. At the time of his death he had eight children, nineteen grandchildren and eleven great grandchildren.

Electoral history

References

External links
Biographical Directory of the United States Congress 
Delaware's Members of Congress 
The Political Graveyard 

|-

1921 births
2020 deaths
United States Coast Guard personnel of World War II
Businesspeople from Delaware
Eisenhower administration personnel
Mayors of Wilmington, Delaware
Military personnel from Delaware
People from Chadds Ford Township, Pennsylvania
Princeton University alumni
Republican Party members of the United States House of Representatives from Delaware
St. Mark's School (Massachusetts) alumni
United States Coast Guard officers
Tower Hill School alumni